Bellport Village Historic District, formerly known as the Bell Street Historic District, is a national historic district located at Bellport in Suffolk County, New York. Located within the district is the separately listed Bellport Academy. It also includes the Village Hall, Bellport Community Center, the former fire house, and a museum/exchange shop built in 1890, as well as other structures.

It was added to the National Register of Historic Places in 1980.

Gallery

References

External links
}}
The Bellport-Brookhaven Historical Society

Historic districts in Suffolk County, New York
Brookhaven, New York
Historic districts on the National Register of Historic Places in New York (state)
National Register of Historic Places in Suffolk County, New York